The Contestani were an ancient Iberian (Pre-Roman) people of the Iberian peninsula (the Roman Hispania). They are believed to have spoken the Iberian language.

They lived in a region located in the southwest of Hispania Tarraconensis, east of the territory of the Bastetani, between the city of Urci, located NE of the Baetica and river Sucro, today known as Júcar. Nowadays this would correspond to a section of the Albacete Province, the eastern part of the Region of Murcia and the southern part of the Valencian Community.

Cartago Nova was within its territory. Other important towns were Setabi (Xàtiva), Lucenti or Lucentum (La Albufereta in Alicante), Alonis (Villajoyosa), Ilici (Elche), Menlaria, Valentia and Iaspis. Iberian coins were minted at Setabi. Important Contestani archaeological sites include Tolmo de Minateda hill near Hellín and Bastida de les Alcusses, near Mogente.

See also
Iberians
Pre-Roman peoples of the Iberian Peninsula
Lucentum
Lady of Elche
Treasure of Villena
Tolmo de Minateda
La Bastida de les Alcusses

References

External links

https://web.archive.org/web/20120721085139/http://www.contestania.com/
Detailed map of the Pre-Roman Peoples of Iberia (around 200 BC)
Alicante Archaeological Museum
Villena Archaeological Museum

Ancient peoples of Spain
Pre-Roman peoples of the Iberian Peninsula